Trifurcula liskai is a moth of the family Nepticulidae. It is found in Slovenia, northern Italy and Austria.

The larvae feed on Globularia cordifolia. They mine the leaves of their host plant. The mine consists of  a straight, very narrow corridor which is completely filled with frass. Often the mine crosses to another leaf, where the corridor becomes somewhat wider.

External links
bladmineerders.nl
Fauna Europaea

Nepticulidae
Moths of Europe
Moths described in 2000